Louis P. Pahl (October 13, 1833 – April 3, 1891) was a member of the Wisconsin State Assembly.

Biography
Pahl was born on October 13, 1833 in the Kingdom of Württemberg. He married Margaret Louisa Riley and together they had four children. Pahl died on April 3, 1891 from Bright's disease of the kidneys (nephritis).

Career
Pahl was a member of the Assembly during the 1876 session. Other positions he held include treasurer of Oconto, Wisconsin. He was a member of the Reform Party.

References

External links
Ancestry.com

People from the Kingdom of Württemberg
People from Oconto, Wisconsin
Members of the Wisconsin State Assembly
City and town treasurers in the United States
Wisconsin Reformers (19th century)
1833 births
1891 deaths
19th-century American politicians